Self-Portrait in a Striped T-shirt (1906) is an oil on canvas painting by Henri Matisse from his Fauvism period, in the collection of Statens Museum for Kunst, Copenhagen, Denmark.

References

1906 paintings
Paintings by Henri Matisse
Fauvism
Self-portraits
20th-century portraits
Paintings in the collection of the National Gallery of Denmark

20th-century paintings in Denmark